Words That Sing Well is the second solo album by American musician Clint Lowery (under the name Hello Demons...Meet Skeletons), released on April 19, 2011. A hardcopy release of the new album and 2008's Chills EP was released via the official online store on April 15, 2011.

Writing and production
The album's instrumental and programming work was recorded at Architekt Music in Butler, NJ, in January 2011 and the vocals and guitar were recorded with Corey Lowery (Stuck Mojo, Stereomud, Eye Empire) at Clint Lowery's home studio in February 2011.

Track listing

Personnel
 Clint Lowery – Vocals, guitar, bass, drums
 Corey Lowery – Vocal production
 George Roskos and Kurt Wubbenhorst – executive producers
 Kurt Wubbenhorst – Additional bass and drums, Programming
 Mike Ferretti – Engineer, Mixing
 Jeremy Gillespie – Additional engineer
 Alan Douches – Mastering
 Recorded and mixed at Architekt Music in Butler, New Jersey
 Mastered at West West Side Music in New Windsor, New York
 BC Kochmit for BCKmedia Inc – Art work, design

References

External links
Official Clint Lowery Website

2011 EPs
Clint Lowery albums
Hard rock EPs